Jind Institute of Engineering and Technology is an institute of higher education in Jind, Haryana, India. It is situated on Jind-Panipat Road. It was established in 1998 and is affiliated to Kurukshetra University, Kurukshetra for all academic purposes. The college offers different engineering programs like Computer Science and Engineering, Mechanical Engineering, Electronics and Communication Engineering, Electrical Engineering and Civil Engineering.

See also
 Kurukshetra University
 List of Engineering Colleges affiliated to Kurukshetra University, Kurukshetra
 Education Maximum School of Engineering and Applied Research
 List of Colleges affiliated to Kurukshetra University, Kurukshetra

References

Educational institutions established in 1998
Engineering colleges in Haryana
1998 establishments in Haryana
Kurukshetra University
Jind